Baribathan is a village in Paglakanai Union of Jhenaidah Sadar Upazila, Jhenaidah District of southwestern Bangladesh.

Geography
Baribathan is located near Jhenaidah town at 23°31'34.2"N 89°08'56.2"E. Baribathan is bounded by the villages of Rajapur, Fakirabad, Varuapara, Goyeshpur. Tropical vegetation and moist soils characterize the land. The village has two mosque, one primary school and one madrasa.

Demographics
According to the 2011 Bangladesh census, Baribathan had 444 households and a population of 1,827. The village is 99.5% Muslim and 0.5% Hindu.

Points of interest
 Dhol Somudur Dighi, Baribathan: A huge pond attracts many visitors.

Education
 Baribathan Govt. Primary School
 Baribathan Adarsha Dakhil Madrasa

References

External links
 

Jhenaidah District